

This is a list of the National Register of Historic Places listings in Norton, Virginia.

This is intended to be a detailed table of the property on the National Register of Historic Places in Norton, Virginia, United States.  The locations of National Register properties and districts for which the latitude and longitude coordinates are included below, may be seen in a Google map.

There is 1 property listed on the National Register in the city.

Current listing

|}

See also

List of National Historic Landmarks in Virginia
National Register of Historic Places listings in Virginia
National Register of Historic Places listings in Wise County, Virginia

References

 
Norton